The Hemingway–Boulders Wilderness is a protected area in the western United States, located in the Sawtooth National Recreation Area in central Idaho. Part of the Sawtooth National Forest in Blaine and Custer counties, the  wilderness covers part of the Boulder Mountains and directly adjoins the Jim McClure–Jerry Peak Wilderness on its northeast side and is south of the Cecil D. Andrus–White Clouds Wilderness, which it does not directly adjoin.

It is named for the Boulder Mountains and writer Ernest Hemingway, who was a resident of nearby Ketchum. The area was added to the National Wilderness Preservation System on August 7, 2015, with the passage of the Sawtooth National Recreation Area and Jerry Peak Wilderness Additions Act; sponsored by Representative Mike Simpson, it passed Congress without objection and was signed into law by President Barack Obama.

References

Sawtooth National Forest
Protected areas established in 2015
Protected areas of Blaine County, Idaho
Protected areas of Custer County, Idaho
Wilderness areas of Idaho
2015 establishments in Idaho